Frazer Clarke (born 7 August 1991) is a British professional boxer. He won bronze in Tokyo at the 2020 Summer Olympics.

In December 2015, he won the super heavyweight division at the Rio 2016 test event.

In 2016, he was ultimately overlooked for Olympic qualification in favour of fellow super heavyweight boxer Joe Joyce (who went on to claim the silver medal in Rio 2016); however, he did make the British Lionhearts squad for their maiden WSB final against the Cuba Domadores and won his match against Lenier Pero, thereby denying the Domadores what would have otherwise been a 10–0 whitewash.

In 2017, he contested the European Championships and finished with a silver medal despite tearing his hamstring en route to the final. The subsequent operation required to mend it forced him to miss that year's World Championships.

In 2018, he beat Satish Kumar in the Commonwealth Games super heavyweight final, taking a unanimous judges' decision to claim gold.

In 2019, Clarke was selected to compete at the European Games in Minsk, Belarus, where he suffered a surprise defeat to Nelvie Tiafack in the round of 16. On his World Championships debut, he was originally deemed to have beaten Maksim Babanin by split decision (3:2) in the quarterfinals; this result was later overturned by a bout review jury on appeal.

It was announced in December 2021 that Frazer had signed a contract with promotional company BOXXER. His first professional fight was against Jake Darnell, which was on the undercard of Amir Khan vs. Kell Brook. He won the fight via KO in round one.

Amateur career

Past results 

 2016 – World Series of Boxing Season 2016 Semi-finals – +91KG Won against Kamshybek Kunkabayev (KAZ) 3:0
 2016 – World Series of Boxing Season 2016 Quarter-finals – +91KG Won against Vladyslav Sirenko (UKR) TKO 5th round
 2016 – World Series of Boxing Season 2016 11th Round – +91KG Won against Nigel Paul (TRI) TKO 5th round
 2016 – Strandja Memorial Tournament (Sofia, BUL) 3rd place – +91KG Lost to Petar Belberov (BUL) 2:1 in the semi-final; Won against Kem Ljungquist (DEN) WO in the quarter-final; Won against Ali Eren Demirezen (TUR) 3:0 in the first preliminary round
 2016 – World Series of Boxing Season 2016 4th Round – +91KG Won against Ahmed Bourous (MAR) 3:0
 2015 – Olympic Test Event (Rio de Janeiro, BRA) 1st place – +91KG Won against Erik Pfeifer (GER) 2:1 in the final; Won against Satish Kumar (IND) 3:0 in the semi-final
 2015 – President’s Cup (Erzurum, TUR) 1st place – +91KG Won against Ibrahim Demirezen (TUR) WO in the final; Won against Ihor Shevadzutskiy (UKR) 3:0 in the semi-final; Won against Nkoya Ngoma (DRC) WO in the quarter-final; Won against Muhammer Taha Aslan (TUR) TKO 1st round in the first preliminary round
 2015 – British Championships (Rotherham, ENG) 1st place – +91KG Won against Joshua Quailey (ENG) TKO 3rd round in the final
 2015 – English National Championships 1st place – +91KG Won against Natty Ngengwa (ENG) 3:0 in the final; Won against Joshua Quailey (ENG) 3:0 in the semi-final
 2015 – Strandja Memorial Tournament (Sofia, BUL) 7th place – +91KG Lost to Petar Belberov (BUL) 2:1 in the quarter-final
 2014 – Golden Belt Tournament (Chiajna, ROM) 1st place – +91KG Won against Yaroslav Doronichev (RUS) 3:0 in the final; Won against Daniel Emanuel Costea (ROM) 3:0 in the semi-final
 2014 – Tammer Tournament (Tampere, FIN) 1st place – +91KG Won against Lenroy “Cam Awesome” Thompson (USA) 3:0 in the final; Won against Ruben Nazaryan (BEL) 3:0 in the semi-final
 2014 – European Union Championships (Sofia, BUL) 1st place – +91KG Won against Guido Vianello (ITA) 3:0 in the final; Won against Tony Yoka (FRA) 3:0 in the semi-final; Won against Aleksei Zavatin (MDA) 3:0 in the quarter-final
 2014 – English National Championships 2nd place – +91KG Lost to Joseph Joyce (ENG) TKO 3rd round in the final; Won against Fayz Aboadi Abbas (ENG) 3:0 in the semi-final; Won against Alan Johnson (ENG) TKO 2nd round in the quarter-final
 2014 – Strandja Memorial Tournament (Sofia, BUL) 1st place – +91KG Won against Bahodir Jalolov (UZB) 3:0 in the final; Won against Gu Guangming (CHN) 3:0 in the semi-final; Won against Sergey Kuzmin (RUS) 3:0 in the quarter-final
 2014 – RUS-GBR Dual Match (Astana, KAZ) – +91KG Won against Dmitriy Mukhin (RUS) 3:0
 2014 – KAZ-GBR Dual Match (Astana, KAZ) – +91KG Lost to Zhan Kosobutskiy (KAZ) 2:1
 2013 – Feliks Stamm Memorial Tournament (Warsaw, POL) 2nd place – +91KG Lost to Sergey Verveyko (POL) 18:12 in the final; Won against Yusuf Acik (TUR) 14:8 in the semi-final; Won against Alexei Zavatin (MDA) 10:9 in the quarter-final
 2013 – Gee Bee Tournament (Helsinki, FIN) 3rd place – +91KG Lost to Maksim Babanin (RUS) 19:11 in the semi-final
 2013 – Bocskai Memorial Tournament (Debrecen, HUN) 2nd place – +91KG Lost to Magomed Omarov (RUS) DQ 3rd round in the final; Won against Stefan Sliz (SVK) 19:6 in the semi-final; Won against Ruslan Kakushkin (BLR) 16:9 in the quarter-final
 2012 – EUBC European Olympic Hopes 19–22 Championships (Kaliningrad, RUS) 3rd place – +91KG Lost to Gasan Gimbatov (RUS) 19:13 in the semi-final; Won against Nikita Maculevics (LAT) 16:10 in the quarter-final
 2012 – British National Championships (London, ENG) 2nd place – +91KG Lost to Joseph Joyce (ENG) 37:36 in the final
 2012 – English National Championships 2nd place – +91KG Lost to Joseph Joyce (ENG) 5:0 in the final; Won against Courtney Clift (ENG) DQ 3rd round in the semi-final
 2012 – SWE-GBR Dual Match – +91KG Lost to Otto Wallin (SWE) 32:11
 2011 – Tammer Tournament (Tampere, FIN) 3rd place – +91KG Lost to Kaspar Vaha (EST) 22:13 in the semi-final
 2011 – British National Championships (London, ENG) 2nd place – +91KG Loss to Joseph Joyce (ENG) RSCI 2nd round in the final
 2011 – English National Championships 3rd place – +91KG Lost to Fayz Aboadi Abbas (ENG) RSC 3rd round in the semi-final
 2010 – Tammer Tournament (Tampere, FIN) 7th place – +91KG Lost to Lenroy Thompson (USA) 2+:2 in the quarter-final
 2010 – Commonwealth Championships (New Delhi, IND) 3rd place – +91KG Lost to Joseph Parker (NZL) 7:3 in the semi-final
 2009 – EUBC European Confederation Youth Boxing Championships (Szczecin, POL) 7th place – +91KG Lost to Tony Yoka (FRA) 3:2 in the quarter-final; Won against Gheorghe Dinu (ROM) 2:1 in the first preliminary round
 2009 – ENG-GER Youth Dual Match2 (Dublin, IRL) – +91KG Lost to Ali Kiyidin (GER) 13:7
 2009 – ENG-GER Youth Dual Match (Dublin, IRL) – +91KG Won against Ali Kiyidin (GER) 14:4
 2009 – IRL-ENG Youth Dual Match (Dublin, IRL) – +91KG Won against Sean Turner (IRL) 13:2
 2009 – British Youth Championships 1991 Born Boxers (Liverpool, ENG) 1st place – +91KG Won against Rhys Williams (WAL) RSC 3rd round in the final

Professional boxing record

References

External links
 
 
 
 
 

1991 births
Living people
English male boxers
Sportspeople from Burton upon Trent
Commonwealth Games medallists in boxing
Commonwealth Games gold medallists for England
Boxers at the 2018 Commonwealth Games
European Games competitors for Great Britain
Boxers at the 2019 European Games
Super-heavyweight boxers
Boxers at the 2020 Summer Olympics
Medalists at the 2020 Summer Olympics
Olympic bronze medallists for Great Britain
Olympic medalists in boxing
Olympic boxers of Great Britain
Medallists at the 2018 Commonwealth Games